The 2010 European Rowing Championships, the 4th since the decision made in May 2006 by the FISA to re-establish them, was held in Montemor-o-Velho, Portugal, between 10 and 12 September 2010.

Medal summary

Men's results

Women's results

Medal count

External links
 Official website
 Results

References

2010 in rowing
2010
International sports competitions hosted by Portugal
2010 in European sport
Rowing in Portugal